Live 1974 is the only live album released by the highly influential krautrock group Harmonia. It was recorded live in concert on 23 March 1974 at Penny Station in Griessem, Germany. The live album was released in 2007 by Grönland Records. Its release sparked enough interest in the group to convince them to reform in order to promote the album.

Track listing
All music written and performed by Michael Rother, Hans-Joachim Roedelius and Dieter Moebius.

 "Schaumburg" – 10:45
 "Veteranissimo" – 17:25
 "Arabesque" – 5:20
 "Holta-Polta" – 15:00
 "Ueber Ottenstein" – 9:30

Recorded live in concert on 23 March 1974 at Penny Station in Griessem, Germany.

Personnel
Harmonia
 Michael Rother  – guitar, electronic percussion, piano, organ
 Hans-Joachim Roedelius  – electronic organ, piano
 Dieter Moebius  – synthesizer, electronic percussion

Production
 Harmonia - recording, editing, artwork
 Christine Roedelius - photos
 Ann Weitz - photos

References

2007 live albums
Harmonia (band) albums